Lycodon chithrasekarai, also known commonly as the Chithrasekara's Bridal Snake, is a species of snake in the family Colubridae. The species is endemic to Sri Lanka.

Appearance
Anterior body consist with solid white bands and a checkered appearance on the posterior lateral body. Consecutive bands are coalesce along the ventro-lateral margin. Nuchal band is flat. Pre-ocular scale absent. Cloacal shield divided.

Distribution
The snake is recorded from Kanneliya Forest Reserve, Sri Pada Forest, Runa Kanda and Deniyaya areas.

References

chithrasekarai
Snakes of Asia
Reptiles of Sri Lanka
Reptiles described in 2020